Pirie was an electoral district of the House of Assembly in the Australian state of South Australia from 1970 to 1977.

Pirie was created after a boundary redistribution in 1970, essentially as a reconfigured version of Port Pirie.  The last member for Port Pirie, David McKee transferred to the new Pirie.

The town of Port Pirie is currently located in the seat of Frome.

Members

Election results

References 

Former electoral districts of South Australia
1970 establishments in Australia
1977 disestablishments in Australia
Port Pirie